Giorgio Polacco (April 12, 1875 - April 30, 1960) was the conductor of the Metropolitan Opera from 1915 to 1917 and the Chicago Civic Opera from 1921 to 1930.

Biography
He was born in Venice, Italy on April 12, 1875.

In 1915 he became the conductor of the Metropolitan Opera replacing Arturo Toscanini. Polacco held that position until 1917. In 1918 he was hired by the Chicago Opera Association. He married Edith Mason in 1919.

In 1921 he became the conductor of the Chicago Civic Opera. In 1928 he was hospitalized with appendicitis.

He divorced Edith Mason on July 21, 1929. He retired from the Chicago Civic Opera in 1930.

On May 15, 1931 he remarried Edith Mason. They divorced in 1937.

Polacco died in Manhattan on April 30, 1960.

Footnotes

1875 births
1960 deaths
Conductors of the Metropolitan Opera
Italian emigrants to the United States
Chicago Civic Opera
Musicians from Venice
20th-century American conductors (music)
Italian male conductors (music)
Italian conductors (music)
20th-century Italian male musicians
20th-century Italian musicians
20th-century American male musicians